The Vellavii (Gaulish: *Uellauī/Wellawī) were a Gallic tribe dwelling around the modern city of Le Puy-en-Velay, in the region of the Auvergne, during the Iron Age and the Roman period.

Name 
They are mentioned as Vellaviis (var. vellabiis) by Caesar (mid-1st c. BC), Ou̓ellaoúioi (Οὐελλαούιοι, var. -άοιοι, -άϊοι) by Strabo (early 1st c. AD), Vellavi (var. velavi) by Pliny (1st c. AD), Ou̓éllaunoi (Οὐέλλαυνοι, var. Οὐέλλενες) by Ptolemy (2nd c. AD), and as Velavorum in the Notitia Dignitatum (5th c. AD).

The city of Le-Puy-en-Velay, attested ca. 400 AD as civitas Villavorum ('civitas of the Vellavii'), and the region of Velay, attested in 845 as pagus Vellaicus ('pagus of the Vellavi', Velhac in the 13th c., Velai in 1335), are named after the Gallic tribe.

Geography 
The oppidum of Ruessium, an early seat of a Catholic bishop, began to be called during the 4th century the [civitas] que dicitur Vetula in pago Vellavorum— the city "called Vetula in the country ('pays') of the Vellavii" a document of 1004 termed it (Lauranson-Rosaz).

References

Bibliography

Further reading 
 Christian Lauranson-Rosaz, "La Paix des Montagnes: Les origines auvergnates de la Paix de Dieu" esp. note 89.

Historical Celtic peoples
Gauls
Tribes of pre-Roman Gaul